Maurina is both a given name and a surname. Notable people with the name include:

 Maurina Borges da Silveira (1926–2011), Brazilian Roman Catholic Franciscan Sister
 Zenta Mauriņa (1897–1978), Latvian writer, essayist, translator, and researcher